Martin Joseph Lynch (8 August 1926 – 17 December 2016) was an Australian rules footballer who played with Geelong and South Melbourne in the Victorian Football League (VFL).

He was the brother of Jack Lynch (footballer, born 1918).

Notes

External links 

1926 births
Australian rules footballers from Geelong
Geelong Football Club players
Sydney Swans players
Geelong West Football Club players
2016 deaths